
Gmina Pieńsk is an urban-rural gmina (administrative district) in Zgorzelec County, Lower Silesian Voivodeship, in south-western Poland, on the German border.

Neighbouring gminas
Gmina Pieńsk is bordered by the gminas of Lubań, Nowogrodziec, Węgliniec and Zgorzelec. It also borders Germany.

Villages
Apart from the town of Pieńsk, the gmina contains the villages of Bielawa Dolna, Bielawa Górna, Dłużyna Dolna, Dłużyna Górna, Lasów, Stojanów, Strzelno, Żarka nad Nysą and Żarki Średnie.

Twin towns – sister cities

Gmina Pieńsk is twinned with:
 Heřmanice, Czech Republic
 Kunratice, Czech Republic
 Neißeaue, Germany
 Rietschen, Germany
 Rothenburg, Germany
 Schleife, Germany

References

Piensk
Zgorzelec County